Batsford is a village in Gloucestershire.

Batsford may also refer to:

 Batsford (solitaire), a card game
 Batsford Arboretum, a garden at Batsford in Gloucestershire
 Batsford Books, a UK book publisher.
 Brian Batsford (1910–1991), a British MP and illustrator
 Allen Batsford, a British football manager
 Rich Batsford, a British musician

See also
 Båtsfjord (disambiguation), a list of places in Norway